Mateves is a Tanzanian administrative ward located in Arusha Rural District of the Arusha Region. It is one of 21 administrative wards in the district. Mateves means places where the fever tree grows in the Maasai language. Olasiti ward borders Mateves to the north east and Terrat to the south east. To the south of Mateves is Oljoro ward and the southwest of Mateves is the Moita Ward and lastly, towards the west is Kisongo ward. The small town of Ngorbob is the seat of the ward. The ward is home to the Mungu Crater and Loljoro Hill at 1,585 meters. According to the 2012 census, the ward had a total population of 15,632

Economy 
Mateves ward is home to A to Z Textile Mills LTD, which is the largest textile factory in Arusha region and the biggest employer in Mateves ward. The town of Kisongo is actually located inside Mateves ward and not in Kisongo ward as the name entails. Thus Kisongo is the largest settlement in Arusha Rural District which in turn allows for Mateves ward have the highest GDP in the district.

Administration and neighborhoods 
The postal code for Mateves Ward is 23221. 
The ward is divided into the following neighborhoods: 
 Laroi, Mateves
 Lemugur, Mateves
 Ngorbob, Mateves

Education
Mateves ward is home to these educational institutions: 
 Braeburn International School Arusha (private)
 Mateves Secondary School
 Saint Gemma Galgan Primary School (private)
 Africa Academy Arusha Science School (private)
 Hope School (private)
 Taifa Institute of Health and Allied Sciences College (private)
 Bethany Primary School (private)
 Yakini Primary School
 St. Joseph Ngarenaro Primary School (private)
 Upendo Friends School (private)

Healthcare
Mateves ward is home to the following health institutions:
 Kisongo Charitable Health Center (private)
 Olmoti Health Center 
 Ngorbob Medical Center
 Nanovegic Health services (private)
 Mateves Dispensary
 Kisongo Lutheran Medical Center

References

Wards of Arusha District
Wards of Arusha Region